The Archer-class submarines are a class of two diesel-electric submarines in active service with the Republic of Singapore Navy (RSN). Originally launched as the Swedish Navy  submarines HSwMS Hälsingland and HSwMS Västergötland in 1986 and 1987, the two submarines were sold to Singapore in November 2005 and relaunched in June 2009 and October 2010 respectively after extensive modernisation by Kockums, which included a refit to  standards, the insertion of a new hull section with an air independent propulsion system, and additional climatisation for use in tropical waters.

History
Singapore's Ministry of Defence (MINDEF) signed an agreement with Kockums for the supply of two Archer-class (formerly Västergötland-class) submarines to the RSN on 4 November 2005. More than 20 years old and previously in reserve with the Swedish Navy, the submarines were transferred to the RSN on completion of the modernisation and conversion for operation in tropical waters. RSS Archer was launched on 16 June 2009. RSS Archer underwent sea trials following its launch and is now operational. The second submarine, RSS Swordsman, was launched on 20 October 2010. The Archer-class submarines entered service in 2013 and replaced RSS Challenger and RSS Centurion of the Challenger class that were retired in 2015.

Design and construction
The Archer-class submarines were designed and built by Kockums AB as single-hull, double compartment submarines optimised to reduce noise and magnetic signature. The two pressure-tight compartments also enhance safety and survivability of the crew. The submarines were designed to operate in the shallow waters of the Baltic Sea and are therefore also optimised for operation in Singapore waters, which have similar depth profiles. The Archer-class submarines are also equipped with Stirling AIP engines. This enables the submarines to have longer submerged endurance and lower noise signature, enhancing the stealth capability of the submarines. The advanced sonar system allows the submarines to detect contacts at a further distance, while the torpedo system has a better target acquisition capability, which allows the submarines to engage contacts at a longer range.

See also
 List of submarine classes in service

Notes

External links
 MINDEF - Singapore Navy Launches Its First Archer-Class Submarine
 Official Kockums website on the Archer class submarines
 Kockum's AIP Sterling system

Submarine classes
 
Singapore–Sweden relations